Charles Hill, Baron Hill of Luton, PC (15 January 1904 – 22 August 1989) was a British physician and medical spokesman, radio speaker, member of parliament, government minister and broadcasting executive.

Early life and career 
Charles Hill was born in Islington, London and was educated at St Olave's Grammar School in Southwark, London. He won a scholarship to Trinity College, Cambridge where he gained a first class degree. He continued his medical studies at the London Hospital gaining MRCS and MRCP in 1927 and later he gained MB, BCh and MD. He became Deputy Medical Officer of Oxford in 1930. He became Assistant Secretary of the British Medical Association from 1932 and Secretary from 1944 to 1950.

During the Second World War, the Ministry of Health had wanted the BBC to infiltrate health messages into ordinary programmes rather than have dedicated programmes from the Ministry of Food, but the BBC warned that this would not be effective and would be viewed by listeners as patronising. Consequently, Hill's role as the "Radio Doctor" became part of the Ministry of Food's programme, Kitchen Front, broadcast every morning from 1942. Because of the then rules about members of the medical profession advertising he could not broadcast under his own name, and so was just 'The Radio Doctor'. His distinctive rich voice helped make an impact.

Hill was still the BMA's Secretary when the National Health Service was introduced in 1948. He negotiated with Aneurin Bevan and ensured that general practitioners did not simply become salaried employees.

Political career 
Hill stood for Parliament for University of Cambridge in 1945 as an independent. He was successful in 1950, becoming MP for Luton as a Conservative and National Liberal.

He was appointed Parliamentary Secretary to the Ministry of Food in 1951. He became the Postmaster-General (a non-cabinet ministerial position with responsibilities that included broadcasting) in 1955; during his period in office he publicly berated the BBC for its reporting of the Suez Crisis. In May 1956, Hill attempted to formalise the existing agreement by which discussions or statements about matters before Parliament could not be broadcast in the fortnight preceding any debate (the 'fourteen-day rule'). However, the Suez Crisis rendered this policy unworkable in practice and the government agreed to its suspension at the end of the year. Hill, who had been uneasy about the implications of the rule for freedom of expression, was relieved.

From 1957 to 1961, he was Chancellor of the Duchy of Lancaster and from 1961 he was Minister of Housing and Local Government and Welsh Affairs, but he lost his place in the Cabinet in Harold Macmillan's 'Night of the Long Knives' reshuffle in 1962.

Post-political career 
He was appointed as the Chairman of the Independent Television Authority in 1963, where he continued his hostile attitude towards the BBC. He was created a life peer on 13 June 1963 as Baron Hill of Luton, of Harpenden in the County of Hertford. In 1967, Hill announced that all the ITV contracts were to be re-advertised, because he was concerned about the large profits being made by the major companies and their lack of regional identity. This resulted in a radical reorganisation of the ITV network.

He succeeded Lord Normanbrook as the Chairman of the BBC Governors (1967–1972), having been appointed by the Prime Minister, Harold Wilson, to "sort out" the Corporation. His appointment as BBC chairman surprised the BBC's Governors and several resigned. Sir Robert Lusty, the acting chairman, commented that "it was like inviting Rommel to command the Eighth Army on the eve of Alamein".

Harold Wilson encouraged Lord Hill to be active in editorial decisions. Hill had a difficult relationship with the Director-General of the BBC, Hugh Greene, and he eventually forced Greene to resign in 1969. Greene later described Hill as a "vulgarian". He had a quieter relationship with Greene's successor, Charles Curran. He retired from the BBC in 1972 and died in 1989, aged 85.

He married Marion Spencer Wallace, with whom he had two sons and three daughters.

References

External links 
 

1904 births
1989 deaths
Conservative Party (UK) MPs for English constituencies
Hill of Luton, Lord
20th-century English medical doctors
BBC Governors
Chairmen of the BBC
People educated at St Olave's Grammar School
United Kingdom Postmasters General
Chancellors of the Duchy of Lancaster
People from Islington (district)
People from Luton
Luton, Charles Hill, Baron Hill of
UK MPs 1950–1951
UK MPs 1951–1955
UK MPs 1955–1959
UK MPs 1959–1964
UK MPs who were granted peerages
Alumni of Trinity College, Cambridge
Ministers in the third Churchill government, 1951–1955
Ministers in the Eden government, 1955–1957
Ministers in the Macmillan and Douglas-Home governments, 1957–1964
Life peers created by Elizabeth II